During the 1987–88 English football season, Wimbledon F.C. competed in the Football League First Division. It was Wimbledon's second consecutive season in the top flight and eleventh consecutive season in the Football League. They ended the season as FA Cup winners and finished seventh in the league. It was their first season under the management of Bobby Gould, who had been appointed following the close season resignation of Dave Bassett.

Season summary
Wimbledon continued to exceed expectations in the First Division, finishing in seventh in the final table, one place lower than their sixth place the previous season, but, considering that Wimbledon were one of the smallest clubs in the First Division. However, Wimbledon's greatest success during the season, perhaps in their entire history, came in the FA Cup, defeating West Bromwich Albion (4–1, home), Mansfield Town (1-2, away), Newcastle United (1-3, away), Watford (2–1, home) and Luton Town (2-1, neutral) to reach their first ever FA Cup Final, against that season's champions Liverpool. Wimbledon took a lead in the 37th minute when Lawrie Sanchez scored a looping header from Dennis Wise's free kick on the left. Liverpool created many chances, but failed to pull a goal back, with Dave Beasant saving a penalty from John Aldridge after Clive Goodyear was (incorrectly) adjudged to have fouled inside the box; Beasant was the first goalkeeper to ever save a penalty in an FA Cup final at Wembley. Wimbledon held on to win their first (and only) FA Cup. Due to the ban on English clubs competing in European competition as a result of the Heysel disaster, Wimbledon were denied the opportunity to compete in the Cup Winners' Cup.

Kit
Wimbledon's kit was manufactured by Spall and sponsored by Truman. Wimbledon's kit for the FA Cup final were sponsored by Danish brewery Carlsberg, who had signed a deal to sponsor Wimbledon's kits for the next season.

First-team squad

Staff
 Manager: Bobby Gould
 Assistant manager: Don Howe
 Chief scout: Ron Suart
 Youth team manager: David Kemp
 Physiotherapist: Steve Allen
 Kit man: Sid Neal, Joe Dillon

Transfers

In
  Terry Gibson from Manchester United, £200,000, 24 August

Out

Results

First Division

October
 17 October: Luton Town 2-0 Wimbledon

November
 04 November: Wimbledon 1-1 Liverpool
 07 November: Wimbledon 2-0 Southampton
 14 November: Coventry 3-3 Wimbledon
 21 November: Wimbledon 2-1 Manchester United
 28 November: Chelsea 1-1 Wimbledon

December
 05 December: Wimbledon 1-1 Nottingham Forest
 12 December: Dheffield Wednesday 1-0 Wimbledon
 18 December: Wimbledon 1-0 Norwich City
 26 December: West Ham United 1-2 Wimbledon

January
 2 January: Oxford United 2-5 Wimbledon

March
 5 March: Wimbledon 2-0 Luton Town

May
 9 May: Manchester United 2-1 Wimbledon

Unknown date
 Wimbledon 3-1 Arsenal
 Wimbledon 4-1 Charlton Athletic
 Wimbledon 2-2 Chelsea
 Wimbledon 1-2 Coventry City
 Wimbledon 2-1 Derby County
 Wimbledon 1-1 Everton
 Wimbledon 0-0 Newcastle United
 Wimbledon 1-0 Norwich City
 Wimbledon 1-1 Nottingham Forest
 Wimbledon 1-1 Oxford United
 Wimbledon 2-2 Portsmouth
 Wimbledon 1-2 Queens Park Rangers
 Wimbledon 1-1 Sheffield Wednesday
 Wimbledon 3-0 Tottenham Hotspur
 Wimbledon 1-2 Watford
 Wimbledon 1-1 West Ham United
 Arsenal 3-0 Wimbledon
 Charlton Athletic 1-1 Wimbledon
 Derby County 0-1 Wimbledon
 Everton 2-2 Wimbledon
 Liverpool 2-1 Wimbledon (matchday 31)
 Newcastle United 1-2 Wimbledon
 Norwich City 0-1 Wimbledon
 Nottingham Forest 0-0 Wimbledon
 Portsmouth 2-1 Wimbledon
 Queens Park Rangers 1-0 Wimbledon
 Southampton 2-2 Wimbledon
 Tottenham Hotspur 0-3 Wimbledon
 Watford 1-0 Wimbledon

Pld = Matches played; W = Matches won; D = Matches drawn; L = Matches lost; GF = Goals for; GA = Goals against; GD = Goal difference; Pts = Points

FA Cup

League Cup

Full Members Cup

References

1987-88
Wimbledon